Zhong Gong (中功) is a spiritual movement based on qigong founded in 1987 by Zhang Hongbao. The full name (中华养生益智功) translates to "China Health Care and Wisdom Enhancement Practice." The system distinguished itself from other forms of qigong by its strong emphasis on commercialisation, and a targeted strategy that aimed to build a national commercial organisation in China in the 1990s.

Zhong Gong achieved national prominence during the 'qigong fever' that gripped China during the Deng Xiaoping era. The denomination included a nationwide network of schools and healing centres based on Zhang's form of qigong before being outlawed by Chinese authorities in 1999. Zhang Hongbao claimed in 2003 to have about 38 million followers, and even Jiang Zemin allegedly believed in the curative power of Zhong Gong's message.

After China declared Zhong Gong an illegal organisation, all its assets and those of the 3,000 entitles constituting the Unicorn Group were confiscated, its 600 principals arrested. Zhong Gong wilted away once the organisation was no longer able to transmit the material and social benefits which were motivational drivers for its followers. After a warrant for the arrest of leader Zhang Hongbao was issued, he fled to the United States and applied for political asylum—he gained Protective resident status in U.S. on 13 June 2001. Zhang died in a car accident in July 2006.

History and development 
In the aftermath of the 1989 Tiananmen Square demonstrations, Zhang Hongbao retreated to a remote base area in Sichuan, where he reorganised his followers as employees of a web of private enterprises owned by a parent firm, the Qilin Group.

During the early 1990s, Zhong Gong became the most popular of the various qigong schools, but rumours concerning Zhong Gong started to surface. As controversy about Zhong Gong increased, Falun Gong gained in popularity, eventually superseding Zhong Gong as the largest movement of its kind.

Its commercial activities were incorporated in China as the Unicorn Group (麒麟集团), a collectively ownership enterprise. In Mainland China, it had numerous operations, branches, and staff. There were six subordinate divisions, including Qigong training, healthy living, travel, education, medical.

Political scientist Patricia M. Thornton at the University of Oxford lists Zhong Gong as an example of a cybersect, due to the group's reliance internet for text distribution, recruitment and information-sharing among adherents.

Beliefs and teachings 
Palmer, citing Ji Yi, said Zhang developed a style of Qigong which was based on automation, physics, relativity, bionics, and with distinctive use of mechanical engineering jargon, and founded Zhong Gong in 1987, launching it on the auspicious date of 8 August 1987.

Zhong Gong is based on the "qilin culture" (麒麟文化), created by Zhang in 1987 which, as he claimed in 2000, is "an obvious challenge to Marxism and the CCP's one-party rule". According to Zhang's 'spirit-matter dialectics', both spirit and matter have objective existence and can transform into the other under certain circumstances. In 1992, based on the ancient theories of yin and yang, Zhang extrapolated his universal law of motion according to which all objects or matter can subdivide into 'Yin' or 'Yang', predicting anything or act which contravened it would bring eventual disaster. He asserted Marxist property right theory and the derived Communist Party aim to eliminate private property were in conflict with his laws. In 1993, Zhang advanced his theories of 'promotion-restriction-inhibition-transformation' derived from the Five elements. In 1998, Zhang put forward a moral code which he referred to as "eight virtues and eight calls".

Qilin culture
'Qilin Culture' philosophy was developed by Zhang Hongbao, the master of Zhong Gong, and proclaimed during public lectures in Beijing.

According to a well-known account by Ji Yi, a journalist and enthusiastic qigong practitioner himself, "the qilin combines in a single body the essence of different species of living beings: the dragon's head, the pig's nose, the serpent's scales, the deer's body, the tiger's back, the bear's thighs, the ox's hooves and the lion's tail."

Qilin culture, according to Zhang, was made up of eight "systems": a philosophical system based on the traditional "diagram of ultimate return," which is to explain the origin of all creatures, their functions, and final destinations; a system of life sciences based on the use of qi to penetrate the mystery of biological systems; a system of "special medicine," which was different in important ways from Chinese and Western medicine, and "even garden variety qigong"; a system of art and aesthetics included qigong art, architecture, dance, music; a system of education; a system of industrial and political management; a system of everyday behaviour; a system of body practices.

Organisational techniques
Zhang Hongbao's had two organisations which formed the foundation of what eventually became an "impressive set of interlocked enterprises, the engine of which was a Qigong practice" according to Patricia Thornton.

More than any other qigong group, Zhong Gong concerned itself with a systematic training scheme of eight ascending levels. The practitioner would thus have a clear path of progression on which to advance. Unlike other qigong schools, which emphasised mastery of sitting meditation, movements, and inner alchemy, Zhong Gong geared its workshops around the acquisition of specific skills. The participants were to master a skill with satisfaction after several days training. Workshops aimed to train participants in Zhong Gong's brand of organisational and managerial techniques at the "second level." They would then be able to go forth and set up their own Zhong Gong franchises.

Stage one included basic techniques and posters; stage two covered organisational methods, certain qigong performance arts, and the 'secret of secrets' of Buddhist and Taoist techniques; stage three consisted of still meditation (jinggong), qigong hypnosis, and spontaneous boxing; stage four included more advanced qigong techniques like electric qigong, hard qigong etc., while stage five covered Fengshui, massage, regulation of the emotions, and more. The sixth, seventh, and eighth levels were never disclosed to the public.

Zhong Gong drew a large number of staunch believers across China, elaborating a highly organised structure that led Chinese Communist Party authorities to suspect it may turn into an opposing political force.

Qilin Culture's modern management theory, based on the traditional yin—yang and five-elements cosmology, was the basis for the Zhong Gong organisation, according to Palmer. It was claimed to be applicable to family, business or government, and aimed to synthesise the best aspects of the five phases of human social development: primitive society, slave society, feudal society, capitalist society and communist society.

Banned in China
The 12th session of the NPC Standing Committee passed a resolution on 30 October 1999 which allowed it to take action against "heretic cults" and which applied retroactively to Falun Gong, Zhong Gong and any other spiritual groups deemed "dangerous to the state".

However, Zhong Gong has been much more low key than Falun Gong, and the government crackdown on it is almost unknown in China. Palmer describes how Zhong Gong effectively ceased to exist once the organisation was no longer able to provide material and social benefits to its followers.

As a sign of Zhang's acumen, Thornton notes that when the Beijing daily reported that his Beijing-based International Qigong Service Enterprise had been shut down pending an investigation into possible criminal activities, Zhang hired the team of lawyers who had defended Mao's widow during the Gang of Four trial, and managed to gain a public apology from the paper. A five-year string of unsuccessful legal actions against the government followed, during which Zhang managed to elude arrest.

After China declared Zhong Gong an illegal organisation, all its assets and those of the 3,000 entities constituting the Unicorn Group were confiscated, and its 600 principals arrested. After a warrant for the arrest of leader Zhang Hongbao was issued, he fled to the United States and applied for political asylum. He was not granted asylum, but gained Protective Resident Status on 13 June 2001. Zhang died in the United States in a motor accident on 31 July 2006 at the age of 52. After Zhang's death, Zhong Gong almost disappeared from the public's eye.

References

Further reading 
Heterodox teachings (Chinese law)

 - Registration required

External links
 Tian Hua Culture (Official Zhong Gong website)
 Embassy of the People's Republic of China (2000): Zhang Hongbao Is a Criminal Suspect in China

Chinese words and phrases
Meditation
Qigong
Religious organizations based in China
New religious movements
1987 establishments in China
Religious organizations established in 1987
Chinese cults